Pure Drivel is a collection of stories by Steve Martin, published in 1998, many of which first appeared in The New Yorker.

External links
 Pure Drivel at Amazon.com

1998 short story collections
American short story collections
Short story collections by Steve Martin
Hyperion Books books